Susanne Sundfør is the debut studio album by Norwegian singer-songwriter Susanne Sundfør, released on 19 March 2007 through Your Favourite Music. The album reached number three on the Norwegian album chart and was supported by its lead single, "Walls", which also reached number three on the Norwegian singles chart. Sundfør described the record as "folk-inspired."

Track listing

Notes
 "Morocco" features vocals from Odd Martin Skålnes
 The ending of "After You Left" contains a hidden track– an instrumental version of "The Dance"

Personnel
Credits adapted from the album's liner notes.

 Susanne Sundfør – vocals, piano , acoustic guitar 
 Odd Martin Skålnes – vocals 
 Jarle Bernhoft – backing vocals
 Jonny Sjo – bass 
 Vemund Stavenes – bass 
 Ivar Thormodsæter – drums 
 Tommy Kristiansen – guitar 
 Morten Qvenild – synthesizer , autoharp 
 Geir Luedy – electric guitar , hand claps, production
 Hans Petter Aaserud – hand claps, production , mixing 
 Angi Harley – violin
 Espen Lilleslåtten – violin
 Hillary Foster – violin
 Judith Starr – violin
 Julia Dibley – violin
 Siv Grønnli – violin
 Tor Jaran Apold – violin
 Ursula Muhlberger – violin
 Bergmund Waal Skaslien – viola
 Hans Gunnar Hagen – viola
 Ben Nation – cello
 Johan Sebastian Blum – cello
 Eivind Buene – strings arrangements, strings conductor
 Erlend Fauske – strings recording
 Espen Berg – mastering
 Kristin Austreid – artwork

References

Susanne Sundfør albums
2007 debut albums